Naturalness may refer to:

 Naturalness (physics)
 Naturalness (philosophy)
 Naturalness (Dal Shabet EP), 2016
 Ziran, or Naturalness, a key concept in Daoism

See also 
 Naturalism (disambiguation)
 Nature (disambiguation)